Nyranius is a genus of fossil millipedes from the Upper Carboniferous (Westphalian) of Europe, containing the species N. costulatus and N. tabulatus. Specimens reach up to 10mm in width, and are covered in fine grooves, similar to other members of the extinct Xyloiuloidea.

References

Carboniferous myriapods
Carboniferous arthropods of Europe